Jems Robert Koko Bi is an Ivorian sculptor.

He was born in 1966, in Sifra, Ivory Coast. He studied Spanish History between 1986 and 1988 at the University of Abidjan. Between 1988 and 1995, he studied at Institut National Supérieur des Arts et de l'Action Culturelle (INSAAC) in Abidjan. In 1997, he won the DAAD scholarship and moved to Germany where he studied at Kunstakademie Düsseldorf with Klaus Rinke.

Works 
Jems Robert Koko Bi uses wood as the medium in his sculptures. His production also includes performances.

Works 
 "Remember – Repeat – Reprocess" Installation by Jems Robert Koko Bi (Germany/Ivory Coast) and Wolfgang Hekele (Germany) for "Forest Art Path Laboratory" in 2006, in Darmstadt, Germany
 Some works on the website of Freie Akademie der bildenden Künste, Essen
 "Don't Fence Me Out", 2005, Installation for 7th Dak’Art Biennial of Contemporary African Art'.

Exhibitions 
2014 Jems Robert Koko Bi & Katharina Lökenhoff: Kein Titel – galerie#23, Velbert, "The Divine Comedy. Heaven, Purgatory and Hell Revisited by Contemporary African Artists" -Museum für Moderne Kunst (MMK), Frankfurt/Main
 2009 "Art Brussels" Catalogue, Nomad Gallery, Brussels
 2008 "The Great Art Exhibition" Museum Kunst Palast, Düsseldorf, Germany
 2008 Toronto International Art Fair, Toronto, Ontario, Canada
 2008 8th Dak’Art Biennial of Contemporary African Art, Dakar, Senegal
 2008 "Travesia", Centro Atlantico de Arte Moderno, Las Palmas de Gran Canaria, Spain
 2008 "L'homme est un Mystère", Musée de la Briqueterie, Brittany, France
 2008 "Premier choix", Musée de la Rotonde des Arts Contenporains Abidjan, Côte d´Ivoire
 2007 "CAFKA.07 Haptic", an international forum of contemporary public art held in Kitchener, Ontario, Canada
 2007 "AfriqueEurope: Reves croises" Contemporary African Art in Ateliers des Tanneurs, Brussels, Belgium. Group exhibition curated by Yacouba Konaté. Artists included: El Anatsui, Nu Barreto, El Berry Bickle and Luis Basto, Frédéric Bruly Bouabré, Dilomprizulike, Mustapha Dime, El Loko, Tapfuma Gutsa, Annie Haloba, Jak Katarikawe, Jems Robert Koko Bi, Abdoulaye Konate, Bill Kouelany, Siriki Ky, Ndary Lo, Toyin Loye, Churchill Madikida, Joel Mpah Dooh, Francis Mampuya, Ingrid Mwangi, Robert Hutter, Serigne Niang, Babacar Niang, Samuel Olou, Freddy Tsimba, and Guy Bertrand Wouété.
 2006 7th Dak’Art Biennial of Contemporary African Art, Dakar, Senegal
 2006 "EUROPE-AFRICA", Brussels, Belgium
 2005 "Kunst am Baum" in Städtischen Museum in Gelsenkirchen, Germany
 2004 "Sculpteur d'ailleurs", International symposium & exhibition, Abbaye de Bon Repos, Saint- Gelves, France
 2004 "L’homme est un Mystere", Musée de l´espace Francois Mitérand, Guingamp, France
 2004 "Sculpture Sculpture", International Sculptors Symposium, Joucas, France 2004
 2003 "XARALA", Art sans frontière Abbatial Palais, Saint-Hubert, Belgium
 2003 "L'Europe fantôme", Espace Vertebra, Brussels, Belgium
 2003 "Blick nach Afrika" (Heilbronn) Künstlerbund Heilbronn, Germany
 2003 "Carrefour", GEA, Bochum, Germany
 2003 "Bienal de la Habana VIII: El arte con la vida", Wifredo Lam Contemporary Art Center, Cuba
 2003 Düsseldorfer große Kunst Ausstellung, Museum Kunst Palast, Düsseldorf, Germany
 2002 5th Dak’Art Biennial of Contemporary African Art, Dakar, Senegal
 2002 "ASSIMILATION", Atelier vor Ort Anne Berlit, Gallery ATISS, Dak 'Art Biennale and the Dakar
 2001 "Paradis obscur", Forum Bildender Künstler, Essen, Germany
 2001 "Künstler gegen Gewalt und Ausgrenzung", Landtag Düsseldorf, Germany
 2001 "Die andere Seit der Kette", Atelier Projekt Kettenschmiedemuseum, Fröndenberg, Germany
 2000 4th Dak’Art Biennial of Contemporary African Art, Dakar, Senegal
 1999 "Traumfabrik", Galerie Sparkasse Mülheim an der Ruhr, Germany
 1998 Städtische Museen, Heilbronn, Germany (catalogue)
 1998 Iwalawa House, University of Bayreuth, Germany
 1997 ARTEFACT 97, Abidjan
 1996 ARTEFACT 96, Abidjan

Performances 
 2008 "Dédouanement" Musée de la Rotonde des Arts Contemporains, Abidjan
 2006 "Menschen Erde" Waldkunst Pfad, Darmstadt
 2004 "Mea culpa", Joucas en Provence
 2003 "Chemin de l´épreuve", Havana Biennale, Cuba
 2002 "Galère" Dakar Biennale Dakar
 2002 "Camouflage, The Center of Contemporary Art of Southern, East and West Africa, Belgium
 2001 "Return of the children of Gorée", Gorée, Dakar, Sénégal
 2001 "On change de terre", Düsseldorf Art Academy, Germany
 2001 "Zwei Spuren, ein Weg", Anne Berlit – Koko Bi, Alte Synagoge, Essen, Germany
 2001 "Die andere Seite der Kette", Kettenschmiedemuseum, Fröndenberg, Germany

Awards 
 Francophone Prize, Dakar Biennale 2008
 Foundation Art and Culture of North Rhine-Westphalia: Project Scholarship
 The Dakar Biennale, Prize, 2000
 The Kunstverein Düsseldorf Prize

Bibliography

See also
 Contemporary African Art
 Culture of Côte d'Ivoire

References

External links
 
 Information on Jems Robert Koko Bi on African American Visual Artist Database AAVAD 
 Some works of Jems Robert Koko Bi in 8th Dak’Art Biennial of Contemporary African Art
 An article on "The Great Art Exhibition" held in Museum Kunst Palast, Düsseldorf, Germany in 2008 (in German) 

1966 births
Living people
Ivorian sculptors
Kunstakademie Düsseldorf alumni